The Palacio del Segundo Cabo was built in the last decades of the 18th century, between 1770 and 1791, as part of the urban improvement project around the Plaza de Armas.

History
The Palacio del Segundo Cabo is located very close to the founding site of the city on O'Reilly street number 4 between Avenida del Puerto and Tacón, right at the epicenter of the restoration project of the City Historian's Office.
The decision to build the Palace construction for the 'Casa de Administración de Correos' would make Havana the center for postal communication between Europe and the Latin American colonies. Later other uses were assigned to it. It housed the Intendancy, Accounting Office, Secretariat, Archive and General Treasury of the Army and the offices and residence of the Sub-Inspector General Segundo Cabo, which gave it the name by which it is recognized to this day.

Once the Spanish colonial domination ended, the building became the seat of the Senate of the new Republic. In 1910 the architect Eugenio Rayneri Piedra carried out remodeling that altered the two front bays on the upper floor. When the Senate moved to the recently built National Capitol in 1929, the Supreme Court of Justice was installed in the Palace. In 1926 the architects Govantes and Cabarrocas intervened in the building, bringing to light important ornamental details that had been covered in previous restorations. At that time, the exterior plaster of the building was removed to expose its ashlar masonry.

Architecture

The Palacio del Segundo Cabo is the work of the Cuban engineer Antonio Fernández de Trebejos y Zaldívar, a testimony to the birth of public civil architecture, and representative of the moderate "Cuban baroque" style in the Havana constructions of the late eighteenth century. It is conditioned by the hardness of the quarry stone used for its construction and by the sobriety of the lines. Its portal with an arcade stands out for its semicircular arches that rest on pillars made up of semi-circular columns attached to the sides.  It is said that it was one of the first buildings that replaced wood with iron. Its portal is flanked by gigantic pilasters. The succession of elaborate mixtilinear arches that lead from the hall to the staircase, give this look a notable aspect of depth. The central courtyard is small and markedly vertical, and the gallery on the upper floor is closed by windows with French shutters and colored lights.

Gallery

See also

 List of buildings in Havana
 Neoclassical architecture

Notes

References

External links

Cuban Architecture

Buildings and structures in Havana
Architecture in Havana